Sławomir Maciej Bittner (codename: Maciek, Kajman Wojak; born 21 July 1923, Warsaw - died 28 February 1944, Warsaw, Poland) was a Polish scoutmaster (podharcmistrz) and second lieutenant of the Armia Krajowa.

Arrested on 18 February 1944 by the Gestapo, he was killed, probably shot to death, several weeks later on 28 February at Pawiak prison. He was 20 years old.

Major sabotage actions
 commander of the section "Sten I" in the "Arsenal action" on 26 March 1943
 commander of the liquidation action of SS-Obersturmbannführer Schultz on 6 May 1943
 commander of the group "Więżniarka" during the rescue action of Polish prisoners on the train station in Celestynów on 19 May 1943
 commander of a group in the "Sól action" on 27 May 1943
 covered a bridge during the "Czarnocin action" on 5/6 June 1943 in Targówek
 covered a liquidation action of a Gestapo agent, executed in June 1943 by Wanda "Lena" Gertz
 commander of a cover group during the "Góral action" on 12 August 1943
 commander of the group "Atak" during the "Taśma action" in Sieczychy near Wyszków on 20 August 1943
 commander of the group "Lotnicy" during the "Wilanów action" on 26 September 1943

He was awarded the Cross of Valour (3 April 1943) and the Silver Cross of the Order of Virtuti Militari.

See also

 Polish Secret State
 Związek Harcerstwa Polskiego
 Mury
 Battalion Zośka
 Battalion Parasol
 Jan Bytnar

Military personnel from Warsaw
Home Army members
Polish Scouts and Guides
Polish Army officers
Recipients of the Silver Cross of the Virtuti Militari
Recipients of the Cross of Valour (Poland)
Resistance members killed by Nazi Germany
1923 births
1944 deaths
Polish people executed by Nazi Germany
Executed people from Masovian Voivodeship